Zlatý Bažant (Golden Pheasant) is the most exported Slovak beer brand. It was founded in 1969 and is produced at its brewery in Hurbanovo.  It was acquired by the Heineken International group in 1995 adding on to the group's already impressive repertoire of over 170 beer brands from 125 breweries in 70 countries.

It is distributed in the United States and Canada under the name Golden Pheasant.

History 

Zlatý Bažant, known as "Golden Pheasant", gets its name from the surrounding area of Hurbanovo which is a small town located Southeast of Slovakia's Capital. Bratislava had a large amount of Pheasants during the 1970s that were gold in color inspiring beer-making pioneers decided to give it this name.

In 1971, Zlatý Bažant began to be sold in cans which was the first-ever beer in Czechoslovakia and Eastern Europe to be produced in such a way. Zlatý Bažant bought the non-alcoholic beer Pito in the 1980s. Today, Zlatý Bažant "nealko" continues this tradition. On April 1, 2011, Radler Pheasant, a beer-based drink with lemonade, was launched which came in non-alcoholic and alcoholic options. In April 2016, Zlatý Bažant 73 beer was launched, a beer inspired by the oldest preserved draft brew of Zlatý Bažant beer from 16 April 1973.

Brewery  
Zlatý Bažant is brewed in Hurbanovo Slovakia, which was chosen over any other location in Slovakia because of its warm climate, with the highest temperature in Slovakia all year round on average. The town 115 meters above sea level. The warmer climate allows for the hops to thrive and grow. The warmer climates helps Zlatý Bažant to have a consistent product no matter how many days after production the beer is consumed.

Characteristic 
Zlatý Bažant is characterized by its pleasant, medium bitterness. The medium full bodied taste and balanced sharpness, the mild aroma of Saaz hops and rich, clear golden color - thanks to malt from its own maltings - make the beer one of the most popular in the Slovak market.

Production  

There are 11 steps that take place to create Zlatý Bažant. However, only 7 are needed from start to delivery.

Step 1: The Boil
In this step, the mash is boiled in a cauldron type brewing kettle. In this process, the aim is for the precipitation of proteins in the liquid and leads to obtaining the desired bitterness extract from the hops plant.

Step 2: Fermentation 
In this step, the extract from the Bessel changes into alcohol and carbon dioxide which adds to the strength and the freshness of the beer.

Step 3: Maturation 
Young beer is transferred into smaller separate vessels where the temperature is between 1-2 degrees Celsius which allows for slow fermentation and maturation. The off-flavors in this step reduce making the beer mature.

Step 4: Filtration
Here all the sediments caused by the proteins and the substances/products to produce the beer are removed. This allows the beer to have the perfect sparkle.

Step 5: Quality Control
Laboratory specialists test the beer for quality, alcohol content, and safety to drink.

Step 6: Packing 
This step is crucial as if it is not done correctly carbon dioxide can escape causing the beer to turn bad. Moreover, pasteurization occurs in this step to get rid of any yeast that is left after filtration.

Step 7: Delivery 
From the Hurbanovo brewery, it is transported to all corners of Slovakia to be exported into several countries around Europe and around the World.

Export 

Zlatý Bažant is available in many countries around the world the most notable ones include;
USA
Canada
Slovakia
Denmark
Finland
Germany
Austria
Sweden
Poland
Russia
United Kingdom

Types of Beer 
Zlatý Bažant beers include:
 12° svetlé pivo (light coloured beer 4.7% ABV)
 10° svetlé pivo (light coloured beer 4.3% ABV)
 10° tmavé pivo (dark coloured beer 3.8% ABV)
 Nealkoholické svetlé pivo 5.7° (non-alcoholic light beer 0.5% ABV)
 Bažant Radler Citrón (beer with lemon flavour 2,0% ABV)
 Bažant Radler Citrón Nealko (non-alcoholic beer with lemon flavor 0,5% ABV)
 Bažant Radler Grapefruit (grapefruit-flavored beer 2,0% ABV)
 Seasonal Beers include: Zlatý Bažant Wheat Beer, Zlatý Bažant Porter, Zlatý Bažant Bock, and Zlatý Bažant Dark Ale Yeast

References

External links 
 Official site

Beer in Slovakia
Food and drink companies of Slovakia
Slovak brands
Heineken brands
Food and drink companies established in 1967
Products introduced in 1967
1967 establishments in Czechoslovakia